Sect. Nephrotheca is a section within the genus Osteospermum, belonging to the Calendula tribe in the Daisy family.

The only known species is Osteospermum ilicifolium (previously known as Nephrotheca ilicifolia), native to the Cape Province in South Africa.

References

Endemic flora of South Africa
Calenduleae
Monotypic Asteraceae genera
Taxa named by Carl Linnaeus